Virginia Gamba de Potgieter (born 1954) is the Special Representative of the Secretary-General of the United Nations for Children and Armed Conflict. She was appointed 12 April 2017 by United Nations Secretary-General António Guterres as the replacement for Leila Zerrougui.

Education
Born in San Martín, Buenos Aires, Argentina, Gamba was educated in Bolivia, Peru, Switzerland, Spain, and the United Kingdom. She holds a Master of Science degree in strategic studies from the University College of Wales and a Bachelor of Arts in Spanish and American studies from the University of Newcastle upon Tyne.

Career 
Early in her career, Gamba served as Director for the Centre for Military Transformation of the Argentine Republic (1984–1986) as well as lecturer at the University of Maryland in 1986 and a Senior Lecturer in Latin American security studies in the Department of War Studies at King’s College London during 1987–1990.

In the 1990s, she was the director of the Disarmament and Conflict Resolution Project of the United Nations Institute for Disarmament Research (UNIDIR) in Geneva.  In 1998, she was also Head of the Small Arms Programme at the Institute for Security Studies in South Africa.

From 2001 to 2007, Gamba was Director of South-South Interactions at SaferAfrica. From 2007 to 2009, Gamba worked with the European Union as an Expert Consultant and helped develop the African Common Approach to Combat Illicit Small Arms Trafficking.

From 2009 to 2012, Gamba served as deputy director of Safety and Security at the Institute for Public Safety in Argentina’s Ministry of Justice and Human Rights.

From 2012 to 2015, Gamba held the position of Director and Deputy to the High Representative for Disarmament Affairs in the United Nations Office for Disarmament Affairs (UNODA). She later served Head of the Organisation for the Prohibition of Chemical Weapons-United Nations Joint Investigative Mechanism established by Security Council Resolution 2235 on the use of chemical weapons in Syria.

Other activities
 Global Partnership to End Violence Against Children, Member of the Board

Recognition
Gamba shared the Nobel Peace Prize as formal member of the executive board of the Pugwash Conferences on Science and World Affairs (1995) with Joseph Rotblat. She served on the Pugwash board from 1985 to 1996.

Notes

1954 births
Living people
Alumni of Aberystwyth University
Alumni of Newcastle University
Argentine political people
Argentine officials of the United Nations
Argentine women diplomats
Arms control people
United Nations Institute for Disarmament Research people
People from San Martín, Buenos Aires
Special Representatives of the Secretary-General of the United Nations